The Myriangiaceae are a family of fungi in the Ascomycota, class Dothideomycetes. Species in this family have a widespread distribution (and are especially prevalent in tropical areas), and are typically found associated with scale insects. The family occupies an isolated phylogenetic position within the Dothideomycetes.

References

Myriangiales
Dothideomycetes families
Taxa named by William Nylander (botanist)